Saleh Faraj (born 5 February 1955) is a Kuwaiti hurdler. He competed in the men's 110 metres hurdles at the 1976 Summer Olympics.

References

1955 births
Living people
Athletes (track and field) at the 1976 Summer Olympics
Kuwaiti male hurdlers
Olympic athletes of Kuwait
Place of birth missing (living people)
Athletes (track and field) at the 1974 Asian Games
Asian Games competitors for Kuwait